Kawalwadi is a village  in Solapur District in Karmala Tahsil  of Maharashtra state, India.

Demographics
Covering  and comprising 148 households at the time of the 2011 census of India, Ramwadi had a population of 845. There were 430 males and 415 females, with 114 people being aged six or younger.

Education 
In Kawalwadi, the zilla panchayat administers a primary school up to 5th Standard. Thereafter, students have to go  to Jinnti for schooling.

References

Villages in Karmala taluka